The Fourth Federal Electoral District of Coahuila (IV Distrito Electoral Federal de Coahuila) is one of the 300 Electoral Districts. Mexico is divided for elections to the federal Chamber of Deputies and one of seven such districts in Coahuila.

It elects one deputy to the lower house of Congress for each three-year legislative period using the first past the post system.

District territory
Coahuila's Fourth District covers the eastern portion of the municipality of Saltillo.

The district's head town (cabecera distrital), where results from individual polling stations are gathered together and collated, is the city of Saltillo.

Deputies returned to Congress from this district

L Legislature
 1976–1979: Julián Muñoz Uresti (PRI)
LI Legislature
 1979–1982:
LII Legislature
 1982–1985:
LIII Legislature
 1985–1988:
LIV Legislature
 1988–1991: Rogelio Montemayor Seguy (PRI)
LV Legislature
 1991–1994:
LVI Legislature
 1994–1997: Marco Antonio Dávila Montesinos (PRI)
LVII Legislature
 1997–2000: Horacio Veloz Muñoz (PRI)
LVIII Legislature
 2000–2002: Ernesto Saro Boardman (PAN)
 2002–2003: María Teresa Romo Castillón (PAN)
LIX Legislature
 2003–2006: Norma Dávila Salinas (PRI)
LX Legislature
 2006–2009: Yericó Abramo Masso (PRI)

References

Federal electoral districts of Mexico
Federal Electoral District 04
Federal Electoral District 04
Saltillo